The Hood River, formerly known as Dog River, is a tributary of the Columbia River in northwestern Oregon, United States.

West Fork
It flows generally east-northeast and joins the East Fork from the west near Dee.

Middle Fork
It flows north through the upper Hood River Valley.

East Fork

Main stem
It joins the Columbia at Hood River, a popular destination for windsurfing and kiteboarding in the Columbia Gorge.

History

The maps of the Lewis and Clark Expedition show the Hood River under the name Labeasche River after Francis Labiche, one of the expedition's members. In the mid-19th century pioneer era a party of starving travelers resorted to eating dog meat. As a result, the Hood River became known as the Dog River. This name was unpopular. A pioneer resident of the area, Mrs. Nathaniel Coe, was able to change local usage to Hood River, after Mount Hood. The name Hood River appeared on maps as early as 1856. The older Dog River name became attached to a lesser tributary of the East Fork Hood River.

Powerdale Dam built in the early 1920’s on the Lower Hood River once supplied nearly 6 MW of hydro power. Built by PacificCorp, Powerdale dam was fully removed in Summer of 2010. The Old Powerhouse still stands as a historical/visual reminder of hydro generation on the Hood River. PacificCorp donated 400 acres of surplus land between the former Powerdale Dam and the Old Powerhouse downstream in 2013 to Hood River County (101 acres) and Columbia Land Trust (299 acres) to be a fully protected riparian buffer. Other conservation successes have occurred along the Hood River and its tributaries. The 12 foot high Odell Creek Dam on Odell Creek was removed by September 2016.  Farmers continue to upgrade/screen irrigation diversions for the protection of the Columbia River Fisheries. All indications point to a healthier and improved salmon and steelhead fishery on the Hood River thanks to continued efforts of Oregon Department of Fish and Wildlife (ODFW), local interests, and collaborative efforts with the Warm Springs Tribe.

Maps

See also

 List of Oregon rivers

References

External links

Rivers of Oregon
Columbia River Gorge
Rivers of Hood River County, Oregon
Tributaries of the Columbia River
Wild and Scenic Rivers of the United States